State Road 45 is a state route from Bean Blossom, Indiana to Scotland, Indiana in the southern half of the state.

Route description
From Bean Blossom and through Brown County, State Road 45 is a narrow, shoulderless two-lane road that passes between the Morgan-Monroe State Forest and the Yellowwood State Forest.

As the road passes into Monroe County, the woods disappear and farms and homes begin to line the road. The road remains hilly and curvy until it reaches Bloomington, where it bypasses the city concurrent with State Road 46 and then State Road 37 and Interstate 69. West of Bloomington, shoulders appear on State Road 45 and its two lanes become wider. The road meanders with the rolling terrain until it meets and overlaps State Road 58, after which it is straight and flat until its terminus at US 231.

History
Prior to the early 1980s, State Road 45 was multiplexed with U.S. 231 from Rockport to the State Road 58 junction near Scotland.  However, as with State Road 43's former multiplex with 231 from Spencer to Lafayette, the state highway department deleted much of the route.

This left the current segment along with a short, 5-mile section from Patronville to Rockport that acted as a connector to then-U.S. 231 (now State Road 161) and Owensboro, Kentucky. This southern section was decommissioned and turned over to the control of the city of Rockport (within the city limits) and Spencer County (outside of Rockport) in early 2001, about a year before U.S. 231 was rerouted onto the William H. Natcher Bridge.

A major construction project to widen the road to four lanes in Bloomington was completed in November 2012.

Major intersections

References

External links

045
Transportation in Brown County, Indiana
Transportation in Greene County, Indiana
Transportation in Monroe County, Indiana